Steven Jorens (born October 5, 1981) is a Canadian sprint canoer from Aurora, Ontario, who has competed since 1998. Jorens' home club is Richmond Hill Canoe Club, situated on Wilcox Lake, in Richmond Hill, Ontario. Competing in the 2004 and 2008 Summer Olympics, he earned his best finish of ninth in the K-4 1000 m event at Athens in 2004.

References

1981 births
Canadian male canoeists
Canoeists at the 2004 Summer Olympics
Canoeists at the 2008 Summer Olympics
Canoeists at the 2011 Pan American Games
Living people
Olympic canoeists of Canada
Pan American Games gold medalists for Canada
Pan American Games silver medalists for Canada
Pan American Games medalists in canoeing
Medalists at the 2011 Pan American Games